The International Communal Studies Association exists to "provide a common framework for a scholarly exchange of information regarding communal life; communes, intentional communities, kibbutzim and other collective communities throughout the world". It was formed in 1985 during the international conference held at Yad Tabenkin.

References

External links
Official website

1985 establishments in Israel
Communalism